A Christmas Sing with Bing around the World is an album by Bing Crosby. It was released in December, 1956 by Decca Records. It was taken from a radio broadcast on CBS which was transmitted on December 24, 1955. The program was sponsored by the Insurance Company of North America. Paul Weston and his Orchestra supported by the Norman Luboff choir provided the backing to Crosby's vocals which were recorded on December 19, 1955. Other vocal contributions came from various parts of the world and had been pre-recorded and inserted into the broadcast as though they were live. The commercials for Insurance Company of North America were not included in the album.

Billboard reviewed the album commenting "one of the solidest holiday packages to come along, a prime candidate for immediate store exposure. Singer brings superb projection to nine out of 19 selected Christmas carols and hymns, with smoothest of assists from Norman Luboff choir and Paul Weston's work."

Sepia Records included the entire album in their CD "Bing Crosby Through the Years volume ten" which was released in May, 2012.

The success of the first broadcast led to a regular annual series.

Track listing

References 

1956 Christmas albums
Christmas albums by American artists
Bing Crosby live albums
Decca Records live albums
Pop Christmas albums
1956 live albums